Ugo de Wilde (born 20 November 2002) is a Belgian racing driver. He currently races in the European Le Mans Series with Inter Europol Competition.

Career

Karting
Born and raised in Brussels, De Wilde started his karting career in 2011. He competed mainly in European Karting Series, such as the domestic Belgian Kart Cup, where he finished second at the age of nine, and in the CIK-FIA European Championship in his last year of karting in 2016, where he competed against drivers such as Red Bull Academy member Dennis Hauger and Frenchman Théo Pourchaire, trumping the latter in the standings.

Lower formulae 
In 2017 De Wilde made his single-seater racing debut in the French F4 Championship at the age of 14, a record at the time. He didn't score any points until the midpoint of the season, though he drastically improved in its second half, scoring three podiums, helping the Belgian to 12th in the standings. 

In the Winter of 2017-18 the Belgian competed in two rounds of the Formula 4 SEA Championship, where he won five races, which helped him to finish third in the drivers' championship.  

The next year De Wilde continued racing in the now FIA-backed series. He won four races and became vice-champion, 66.5 points behind Caio Collet.

Formula Renault Eurocup
In 2019 De Wilde made his debut in the Formula Renault Eurocup for JD Motorsport. He won the first race of the championship at Monza, however he was unable to score more podium finishes this year. The Belgian finished the season in seventh place.

In 2020 De Wilde would move to Arden Motorsport for another season in the series. Despite three podium finishes De Wilde only managed to finish 9th in the standings.

European Le Mans Series 
De Wilde switched over to the European Le Mans Series for the 2021 season with Inter Europol Competition in the LMP3 category.

Racing record

Career summary

* Season still in progress.

Complete French F4 Championship results 
(key) (Races in bold indicate pole position) (Races in italics indicate fastest lap)

Complete Formula Renault Eurocup results
(key) (Races in bold indicate pole position) (Races in italics indicate fastest lap)

‡ Half points awarded as less than 75% of race distance was completed.

Complete Alpine Elf Europa Cup results
(key) (Races in bold indicate pole position) (Races in italics indicate fastest lap)

Complete European Le Mans Series results 
(key) (Races in bold indicate pole position; results in italics indicate fastest lap)

Complete WeatherTech SportsCar Championship results
(key) (Races in bold indicate pole position; results in italics indicate fastest lap)

References

External links
 

2002 births
Living people
Racing drivers from Brussels
Belgian racing drivers
Formula Renault Eurocup drivers
Arden International drivers
WeatherTech SportsCar Championship drivers
European Le Mans Series drivers
JD Motorsport drivers
French F4 Championship drivers
Team Meritus drivers
Le Mans Cup drivers